The former French Catholic diocese of Rieux existed from 1317 until the French Revolution. It was based at Rieux-Volvestre, south-west France, in the modern department of Haute-Garonne.

It was erected by Pope John XXII, as suffragan to the archiepiscopal See of Toulouse.

Bishops
 Pelfort de Rabastens (1317-1320) (Cardinal from 1320)
 Bertrand de Cardaillac (1321-1324)
 Jean I Tissandier (1324-1348)
 Durand de la Capelle (1348-1353)
 Jean-Roger or Jean II. (1353-1357)
 Pierre de Saint-Martial (1357-1371) (Cardinal)
 Jean III de Lanta (1371-1383)
 Jean IV (1383-1393)
 Thomas (1393-1404)
 Pierre Trousseau (1405-1416)
 Gaucelme du Bousquet (1416-1426)
 Hugues de Roffignac (1426-1460)
 Pierre Bonald (1460-1462)
 Geoffroy de Bazillac (1462-1480)
 Pierre d'Abzac de la Douze (1480-1487)
 Hugues d'Espagne (1487-1500)
 Bertrand d'Espagne (1500-1509)
 Louis de Valtan (1509-1517)
 Gaspart de Montpezat (1518-1521)
 Jean de Pins (1522-1537)
Vacant (1537-1568)
 François du Bourg (1568-1575)
 Jean-Baptiste du Bourg (1575-1602)
 Jean de Bertier (1602-1620)
 Jean-Louis de Bertier (1620-1662)
 Antoine-François de Bertier (1662-1705)
 Pierre de Charrité de Ruthie (1706-1718)
 Alexandre de Johanne de Saumery (1720-1747)
 Jean-Marie de Catellan (1748-1771)
 Pierre-Joseph de Lastic Lescure (1771-1801)

See also
Catholic Church in France
List of Catholic dioceses in France

References

Books

Reference works
 pp. 548–549. (Use with caution; obsolete)
  p. 301. (in Latin)
 p. 175.

 p. 219.
 

Rieux
Religious organizations established in the 1310s
1317 establishments in Europe
1310s establishments in France
Dioceses established in the 14th century